Evelyn "Eva" Converse was an American film and stage actress and model.

Early life
Evelyn was born in Eau Claire, Wisconsin, the daughter of Henry E. Converse and Emma Gilbert.

Career
In 1911, Converse was in the moving picture that illustrated the song showing at the Palace Theater "Won't You Share My Bungalow?" In 1917, Converse appeared in the silent film drama, The Slacker, which was produced and distributed by Metro Pictures. The film caused a spike in recruitment for the U.S. Army just after the U.S. entry into World War I.

In 1909, Converse posed for a portrait by the artist Edwin Austin Abbey titled "The Coronation of Edward VII", which now hangs in Buckingham Palace. Converse portrayed Queen Alexandra. Abbey had searched for two years for a model.

Filmography

References

External links

 

20th-century American actresses
Actresses from Wisconsin
American film actresses
American stage actresses
People from Eau Claire, Wisconsin